The Italian Mixed Curling Championship is the national championship of mixed curling (two men and two women) in Italy. It has been held annually since 2002 (not held in 2003, 2004) and organized by the Italian Ice-Sports Federation.

In mixed curling, the positions on a team must alternate between men and women. If a man throws last rocks, which is usually the case, the women must throw lead rocks and third rocks, while the other male member of the team throws second rocks.

List of champions and medallists
The past champions and medalists of the event are listed as follows (in order - fourth/skip, third, second, lead, alternate; skips marked bold):

References

See also
Italian Men's Curling Championship
Italian Women's Curling Championship
Italian Mixed Doubles Curling Championship

Curling competitions in Italy
Recurring sporting events established in 2002
2002 establishments in Italy
National curling championships
Mixed curling
Annual sporting events in Italy